Lake Oscawana is a lake at the heart of Putnam Valley, New York State, United States.

The lake is fed by a stream from its north end and it drains out into Oscawana Creek at the middle of its southeastern shore. It is located between two hill ranges. Oscawana Creek merges into Peekskill Hollow Creek near the intersection of Peekskill Hollow Road and Oscawana Lake Road in Putnam Valley the hamlet of Lake Peekskill.

The lake has a number of houses around its edges, and a peculiar rock formation (Goose rocks) in the center of the lake, accessible most safely by kayak or canoe. Lake Oscawana provides summer recreation, and some local residents use the lake for boating, swimming, and fishing - from one of the lake's several private beaches.

It features a variety of wildlife including fish, Canada geese, water snakes, turtles, and an occasional stork. In the summer it is cleaned regularly by a floating weed harvester. In the winter, the lake freezes over and allows for ice skating and ice fishing. Legend has it there are several cars at the bottom of lake from when the ice was not thick enough.

Babe Ruth is known to have spent some time on the lake which housed many hotels and resorts in the 1930s. His favorite was called the Casino. Another former resident was Roy Scheider. Scheider's house, which is still owned by his former wife, was filmed in the Adirondack Lake house scene in The Sopranos episode, "Soprano Home Movies".

References

External links
 The Lake in 1865 
 NY Times article
 Putnam Valley

Oscawana
Oscawana